Aagam Mandir (Aagam Temple) is a Jain temple in Tumakuru Karnataka. It is located 65 km from Bangalore, India, by road on Tumkur road. The nearest railway station is Tumkur (3.7 km).

Main temple
This is Shvetambar Jain temple. The principal deity of this temple is Mahaveer Swami, 24th tirthankara of Jainism

See also 
 Mandaragiri

References

External links
 

Jain temples in Karnataka